The 1845 West Suffolk by-election was held on 7 July 1845 after the death of the incumbent Conservative MP, Robert Rushbrooke.  It was retained by the unopposed Conservative candidate Philip Bennet, who was elected on a platform of support for agriculture and the Church of England.

References

Unopposed by-elections to the Parliament of the United Kingdom in English constituencies
1845 elections in the United Kingdom
1845 in England
West
July 1845 events